The 306th Strategic Wing, previously the 306th Bombardment Wing, is an inactive United States Air Force unit. It was last assigned to the Strategic Air Command at RAF Mildenhall, Suffolk and was inactivated on 1 February 1992. 
The wing's mission was to coordinate all SAC air refueling and reconnaissance resources in the European Theater with the United States Air Forces in Europe (USAFE). It assumed the mission of the 98th Strategic Wing when that unit was inactivated in 1976. 

The wing's World War II predecessor unit, the 306th Bombardment Group, was the first operational bombardment group in VIII Bomber Command.  It was stationed at RAF Thurleigh, UK, from 6 September 1942 until 25 December 1945, the longest tenure at one station for any one Eighth Air Force group.  That unit's lineage and history is held by the present-day 306th Flying Training Group, Air Education and Training Command, active at the United States Air Force Academy.  From 1954 until the wing was inactivated, it was temporarily bestowed with the honors and heritage of the 306th Bomb Group.

During the Cold War, Strategic Air Command (SAC) initially established the 306th Bombardment Wing as a Boeing B-29 Superfortress medium bombardment wing at MacDill AFB, Florida in 1950.  It later flew Boeing B-50, Boeing KC-97 and Boeing B-47 Stratojet aircraft at MacDill.

The wing moved to McCoy AFB, Florida in 1963, where it was a redesignated as a heavy bombardment wing flying Boeing B-52 Stratofortress and Boeing KC-135A and KC-135Q Stratotanker aircraft.  The 306th forward deployed to Southeast Asia during the Vietnam War in the 1960s and 1970s.  As a result of post-Vietnam reductions in force, the wing was inactivated in late 1974 with the concurrent closure of McCoy AFB.

the 306th was activated once again as the 306th Strategic Wing at Ramstein AB, West Germany, assuming operational control for SAC air refueling and reconnaissance resources in the European Theater. In 1978, the 306th moved to RAF Mildenhall, United Kingdom. For most of this period the 306 SW controlled KC-135, KC-10 Extender, RC-135 Rivet Joint, SR-71 and U-2 aircraft deployed from the United States to the United Kingdom.  In 1992 it was inactivated and its mission transferred to the 100th Air Refueling Wing under United States Air Forces in Europe (USAFE).

History
  For additional history and lineage, see 306th Flying Training Group

B-47 Stratojet era
The wing activated as the 306th Bombardment Wing, Medium on 1 September 1950 at MacDill AFB, Florida. Upon activation, the 306th Bombardment Group, already stationed at MacDill, was assigned as its operational component, but four months later the group's flying squadrons were attached directly to the wing after and it became a paper organization. The wing was initially equipped with Boeing B-29 Superfortresses and acted as SAC's B-29 crew training organization. In 1951, the 306th received some B-50A Superfortresses from the 43d Bombardment Wing at Davis–Monthan AFB, Arizona to supplement the B-29s but used them for non-operational training flights.

The wing began upgrading to the jet age with the arrival of the new Boeing B-47A Stratojet swept-wing medium bomber.  The B-47As, however, were essentially identical to the XB-47 prototype tested by Air Materiel Command and were intended to act as training aircraft to prepare future B-47B crews. The B-47As were not considered combat ready, since most of them were unarmed and were initially without almost any of their vital electronic components. Deliveries of the B-47A to the USAF began in December 1950, and the aircraft entered service in May 1951 with the wing at MacDill. On 19 November 1951, the 306 BMW received its first operational Boeing B-47B and christened it "The Real McCoy" in honor of Colonel Michael N. W. McCoy, the 306th's wing commander, who flew it from the Boeing Wichita plant to MacDill AFB.

The first Boeing KC-97E Stratofreighter air refueling aircraft assigned to Strategic Air Command was delivered to the wing's 306th Air Refueling Squadron at MacDill AFB on 14 July 1951 and inflight refueling operations started in May 1952, with KC-97s refueling B-47s on operational training missions leading toward combat ready status.  B-47Bs from the 306th Bomb Wing began a 90-day rotational training mission to RAF Fairford, Gloucestershire, in June 1953, marking the first overseas deployment of the B-47. Further overseas deployments by the entire wing followed in January 1955, October 1956, and October 1957 to Ben Guerir AB, Morocco. For its role in advancing jet bombardment tactics, the wing was awarded its first Air Force Outstanding Unit Award.

During this period, the 306th also figured prominently in the filming of the 1955 Paramount Pictures movie, Strategic Air Command starring James Stewart and June Allyson.  The film was made with the full cooperation of the Air Force, with significant filming occurring at MacDill utilizing B-47 aircraft of both the 306th Bombardment Wing and the collocated 305th Bombardment Wing.  In the film's plot Stewart's character is assigned to fly B-47s as a vice wing commander at MacDill.

In 1959 the wing added a fourth bombardment squadron, the 423d Bombardment Squadron as SAC's B-47 force reached its peak of twenty-seven wings.  However, the B-47 soon began to be phased out of SAC's strategic arsenal.  The wing began phasing down, with the 423d becoming non-operational in 1961 and the 369th in early 1963.  The wing began sending aircraft to Davis–Monthan inventory beginning in late 1962 in anticipation of the wing's planned inactivation. However, inactivation plans were cancelled and the wing moved to replace the 4047th Strategic Wing instead.

B-52 Stratofortress era
As the B-52 Stratofortress replaced the B-47, the 306th Bombardment was redesignated as the 306th Bombardment Wing, Heavy and moved on paper from MacDill to McCoy Air Force Base, Florida on 1 April 1963, where it replaced the 4047th Strategic Wing.

4047th Strategic Wing

The 4047th was organized on 1 July 1961 as a tenant of the 321st Bombardment Wing (BW) and assigned to the 823d Air Division at McCoy as part of SAC's plan to disperse its Boeing B-52 Stratofortress heavy bombers over a larger number of bases, thus making it more difficult for the Soviet Union to knock out the entire fleet with a surprise first strike. In September 1961 the 347th Bombardment Squadron, consisting of 15 Boeing B-52 Stratofortresses moved to McCoy from Westover Air Force Base, Massachusetts where it had been one of the three squadrons of the 99th Bombardment Wing. One third of the wing's aircraft were maintained on fifteen-minute alert, fully fueled, armed and ready for combat to reduce vulnerability to a Soviet missile strike.  This was increased to half the wing's aircraft in 1962. The 4047th (and later the 306th) continued to maintain an alert commitment until the 306th was inactivated.

Later that same month, the 4047th became the host for McCoy AFB when the 321st Bombardment Wing inactivated and transferred the 813th Medical Group to the wing, along with 39th Munitions Maintenance Squadron to oversee the wing's special weapons.  The 4047th became fully organized on 1 July 1962 when the 306th Air Refueling Squadron moved to McCoy from MacDill and began converting to Boeing KC-135 Stratotankers.  In 1962, the wing's bombers began to be equipped with the GAM-77 Hound Dog and the GAM-72 Quail air-launched cruise missiles, The 4042d Airborne Missile Maintenance Squadron was activated in November to maintain these missiles.

However, SAC Strategic Wings could not carry a permanent history or lineage and SAC looked for a way to make its Strategic Wings permanent.  In 1962, Headquarters SAC received authority from Headquarters USAF to discontinue its Major Command controlled (MAJCON) strategic wings that were equipped with combat aircraft and to replace them with Air Force controlled (AFCON) units, which could carry a lineage and history.

306th Bombardment Wing

As a result, the 4047th SW was replaced by the 306th Bombardment Wing, which assumed its mission, personnel, and equipment on 1 April 1963.
In the same way the 367th Bombardment Squadron, one of the unit's World War II historical bomb squadrons, replaced the 347th BS. The 813d Medical Group, 39th Munitions Maintenance Squadron and the 306th Air Refueling Squadron  were reassigned to the 306th. Component support units were replaced by units with numerical designation of the 306th. Under the Dual Deputate organization, all flying and maintenance squadrons were directly assigned to the wing, so no operational group was activated, although the 306th Combat Support Group became the wing's administrative support unit. Each of the new units assumed the personnel, equipment, and mission of its predecessor.

Immediately after the move to McCoy, the 306th began transitioning to the B-52D version of the Stratofortress during the spring and summer of 1963 and assumed strategic nuclear alert duties under SAC's Operation Chrome Dome airborne alert program.  Under this program, each SAC bomb wing was periodically tasked, for a specified period of time, to maintain a portion of its bombers airborne and ready to strike. On 16 November 1963, two of eight ground alert lines maintained by the wing's 367th BS were converted to airborne alert lines. Two B-52Ds were flown in cell along the southern Chrome Dome route across Spain to the Mediterranean every day until 31 December 1963. Each B-52D required two air refuelings inbound to Spain and two more outbound over the Mediterranean, with mission duration averaging 25 to 27 hours in length. The 306th Air Refueling Squadron ground alert was also degraded to support Chrome Dome refueling along the southern route.

The 306 BW was tasked to maintain airborne alert several more times until the wing deployed to support conventional bombing operations in Southeast Asia in 1966. Ground alert was reinstated at the SAC directed 50 percent of aircraft assigned rate after each "Chrome Dome" period. In January 1964, KC-135 tanker crews changed to seven-day alert tours while B-52 bomber crews maintained a three-four-day cycle. One additional tanker alert line was added for a total of nine. During the 1960s and 1970s, the 306th served as the host wing for numerous iterations of the annual SAC Bombing and Navigation Competition held at McCoy AFB.

Beginning in September 1966, the 306 BW also began routinely deploying bombers to Southeast Asia as part of Operation Arc Light, Operation Linebacker and Operation Linebacker II operations in Southeast Asia, deploying at various times to Andersen AFB, Guam and Kadena AB, Okinawa.  As part of Operation Young Tiger, it also deployed tankers to these bases and to U-Tapao Royal Thai Navy Airfield, Thailand.  At times these deployments depleted all wing resources remaining at McCoy.

The 919th Air Refueling Squadron (919 ARS) was assigned to McCoy in March 1967.  When not forward deployed for operations over Vietnam, the 306th continued to operate out of McCoy AFB for both training and nuclear alert role. In January 1968, the 306 BW received another Air Force Outstanding Unit Award for this "double-duty" for combat operations in Southeast Asia while maintaining an alert status for SAC.

On 19 November 1968 a B-52, s/n 55-103 attached to the 4252d Strategic Wing and flown by a 306th Wing crew burned and exploded after its jet engines experienced a power failure upon takeoff at Kadena Air Base, Okinawa while preparing to conduct a bombing mission to Vietnam.  The Pilot/Commander, Capt Charles D. Miller (USAF), one of two who later died of burns, was able to keep the plane on the ground.  Had the plane become airborne, it would likely have crashed 1/4-mile north of the runway into a storage area for chemical weapons, where B28 nuclear bombs used in AGM-28 Hound Dog cruise missiles and where W31 nuclear tipped MGR-1 Honest John were stored, and MIM-14 Nike-Hercules nuclear and MIM-23 Hawk conventional anti-aircraft missile launch sites were located.  The burning and exploding 30,000 pounds of 24, 500 lb bombs, (12 under each wing) and 24, 750 lb bombs in the belly bomb bays  created a blast was so powerful that it blew a crater under the aircraft some thirty feet deep and sixty feet across and blew out the windows in the dispensary at Naha AB, twenty-three miles away.

While deployed to Andersen AFB during Linebacker II operations on 21–22 December 1972, the 306 BW sustained a combat loss when B-52D, s/n 56-669, callsign "Straw 2", was hit by a surface-to-air missile after attacking the Gia Lam railway repair shops east of Hanoi.  Despite heavy damage, Straw 2 attempted to divert to Thailand.  The aircraft crossed into Laos, became uncontrollable, and all crewmembers except the radar navigator were rescued. This loss came on top of a stateside loss earlier in the year on 31 March 1972, when B-52D s/n 56-625 sustained multiple engine failures and an engine pod fire shortly after takeoff from McCoy AFB on a routine training mission. The aircraft immediately attempted to return to the base, but crashed just short of Runway 18R in a civilian residential area of Orlando, Florida immediately north of the airfield, destroying or damaging eight homes. The crew of 7 airmen and 1 civilian on the ground were killed.

The 306 BW returned to McCoy AFB from its final Southeast Asia deployment in early 1973 after the Paris Peace Accords ended American involvement in the conflict. From 1971 through 1973, other training activities at McCoy AFB included KC-135Q instruction by the 306th Air Refueling Squadron (306 ARS) and KC-135A instruction by the 32nd Air Refueling Squadron (32 ARS). Whereas KC-135A aircraft typically carried JP-4 jet fuel, KC-135Q aircraft were specifically modified and equipped to offload JP-7 fuel and supported worldwide in-flight refueling requirements for USAF U-2 and SR-71 reconnaissance aircraft.  By the fall of 1973 all wing tactical squadrons were reassigned or became non-operational in preparation for the shutdown of Air Force activity at McCoy.

The 306th was inactivated in July 1974 as part of a post-Vietnam reduction in force and the related base closure process for McCoy AFB.  Its B-52D and KC-135A aircraft assets were redistributed to other SAC wings.  In 1984, a former 7th Bomb Wing B-52D, on loan from the National Museum of the United States Air Force, was flown from Carswell AFB, Texas to the former McCoy AFB, now Orlando International Airport, for permanent static display at the airport's McCoy AFB/B-52 Memorial Park.

306th Strategic Wing

On 15 August 1976, the 306th was activated once again as the 306th Strategic Wing at Ramstein AB, West Germany. but did not become operational until October.  When the 98th Strategic Wing at Torrejon Air Base, Spain inactivated at the end of the year the 306th assumed as the focal point for all operations in Europe and acted as the SAC liaison with United States Air Forces Europe (USAFE) and European Command.

On 1 July 1978, the 306th moved to RAF Mildenhall, United Kingdom and became subordinate to 7th Air Division, which was activated at Ramstein to assume the SAC liaison mission. The wing was assigned the 922d Strategic Squadron at Hellenikon AB, Greece and a month later, the 34th Strategic Squadron at Zaragoza Air Base, Spain. For most of this period the wing operated KC-135s and RC-135s from Mildenhall, Zaragoza, and Hellenikon. In 1985, McDonnell Douglas KC-10A Extender aircraft were assigned to Zaragoza.

The 306th supported air refueling requirements for a variety of aircraft in or transiting the European Theater including USAF EC-135s, RC-135s, USAF & NATO E-3As, USAF F-111s, F-4s, C-141s, C-5s, KC-10s, MC-130s, B-52s, B-1s, SR-71s, and RAF Lightning F6 aircraft. The 306 SW operated at Mildenhall until 31 March 1992 when it was inactivated in anticipation of SAC's disestablishment and the transfer of SAC's European assets. The wing's tanker mission transferred to USAFE's 100th Air Refueling Wing, while its air reconnaissance mission and 922d squadron transferred to Air Combat Command's 55th Wing.

Lineage
 Constituted as the 306th Bombardment Wing, Medium on 11 August 1948
 Activated on 1 September 1950
 Redesignated 306th Bombardment Wing, Heavy on 1 April 1963
 Inactivated on 1 July 1974
 Redesignated 306th Strategic Wing on 14 August 1976
 Activated on 15 August 1976
 Inactivated on 31 March 1992

Assignments
 Second Air Force, 1 September 1950
 6th Air Division, 10 February 1951
 Attached to: 7th Air Division, 11 June – 7 September 1953
 Attached to: 5th Air Division, 5 January – 21 February 1955 and 23 October 1956 – 9 January 1957
 Attached to: Sidi Slimane Task Force, 9–15 October 1957
 823d Air Division, 6 February 1961
 42d Air Division, 30 June 1971 – 1 July 1974
 Strategic Air Command, 15 August 1976
 7th Air Division, 1 July 1978
 Strategic Air Command, 1 February 1992 – 31 March 1992

Components
Group
 306th Bombardment Group: 1 September 1950 – 16 June 1952 (not operational after 11 February 1951)

Squadrons
 34th Strategic Squadron: 1 August 1978 – 1 October 1986; 1 August 1990 – 31 March 1992
 Zaragoza AB, Spain
 305th Air Refueling Squadron: attached 5 January 1954 – 21 February 1955 and c. 20 December 1956 – c. 9 January 1957; assigned 1 May 1959 – 15 January 1960
 306th Air Refueling Squadron: attached 10 February 1951 – 15 June 1952, assigned 16 June 1952 – 1 July 1962 (detached 8 November – 22 December 1954, 5 January – 21 February 1955, 20 December 1956 – 9 January 1957, c. 9–15 October 1957, 1 July – 5 October 1958, 5 April – 12 July 1961; not operational, 13 June – 1 July 1962); assigned 1 April 1963 – 30 September 1973 (not operational, 1–30 September 1973)
 367th Bombardment Squadron: attached 10 February 1951 – 15 June 1952, assigned 16 June 1952 – 1 July 1974 (not operational, 3 January – 1 April 1963 and c. 1 November 1973 – 1 July 1974)
 368th Bombardment Squadron: attached 10 February 1951 – 15 June 1952, assigned 16 June 1952 – 1 April 1963
 369th Bombardment Squadron: attached 10 February 1951 – 15 June 1952, assigned 16 June 1952 – 1 April 1963 (not operational, 3 January – 1 April 1963)
 423d Bombardment Squadron: 1 January 1959 – 1 January 1962 (not operational, 15 October 1961 – 1 January 1962)
 919th Air Refueling Squadron: 25 March 1967 – 30 June 1971 (not operational, 15–30 June 1971)
 922d Strategic Squadron: 1 July 1978 – 31 March 1992
 Hellenikon AB, Greece.

Stations
 MacDill AFB, Florida, 1 September 1950
 McCoy AFB, Florida, 1 April 1963 – 1 July 1974
 Ramstein AB, West Germany, 15 August 1976
 RAF Mildenhall, Suffolk, 1 July 1978 – 1 February 1992

Aircraft assigned

 B-29 Superfortress, 1950–1951
 B-50 Superfortress, 1951
 B-47 Stratojet, 1951–1963
 KC-97 Stratofreighter, 1951–1962

 B-52 Stratofortress, 1963–1973
 KC-135 Stratotanker, 1963–1973; 1975–1992 (Attached)
 Boeing RC-135 (attached), 1976–1992

See also
 List of B-29 Superfortress operators
 List of B-47 units of the United States Air Force
 List of B-50 units of the United States Air Force
 List of B-52 Units of the United States Air Force
 Strategic Air Command

References
 Notes

 Citations

Bibliography

 
 
 
 
 
 

0306
Military units and formations disestablished in 1992
Military units and formations established in 1948